"A Thousand Hallelujahs" is a song by New Zealand singer-songwriter Brooke Ligertwood. It was released as the lead single from her first live album, Seven (2022), on 14 January 2022. Brooke Ligertwood co-wrote the song with Phil Wickham and Scott Ligertwood. The single was produced by Brooke Ligertwood and Jason Ingram.

"A Thousand Hallelujahs" peaked at number 44 on the US Hot Christian Songs chart.

Background
Brooke Ligertwood announced that she would releasing "A Thousand Hallelujahs" as the first single from her live album, Seven (2022), on 14 January 2022. A Thousand Hallelujahs" was released on 14 January 2022, accompanied with its live music video. Ligertwood shared the story behind the song, saying:

Composition

Reception

Critical response
Reviewing for 365 Days of Inspiring Media, Jonathan Andre gave a positive review of the song, saying "A passionate declaration of our allegiance to Christ, it's a perfect representation of a 'modern hymn', a worship song for the church that has become a joy to listen to (and sing along with)." Gerod Bass of Worship Musician magazine wrote in his review: "Congregationally friendly and vertically focused, this tune will be sung in churches all over the world and your church should definitely add this one to your Sunday setlist." Timothy Yap of JubileeCast described the song as having "a congregational affinity," concluding that "Featuring a memorable chorus with a melody that invites you to worship, "A Thousand Hallelujahs" ranks high up there with Hillsong's classics such as "What a Beautiful Name" and "Who You Say I Am.""

Accolades

Commercial performance
"A Thousand Hallelujahs" debuted at number 44 on the US Hot Christian Songs chart dated 29 January 2022, concurrently charting at number six on the Christian Digital Song Sales chart.

Music videos
On 14 January 2022, Brooke Ligertwood released the live performance video of "A Thousand Hallelujahs" via YouTube. The live performance video was recorded on 11 November 2021, at The Belonging Co, a church in Nashville, Tennessee. Ligertwood published the lyric video of the song via YouTube on 20 January 2022. The official acoustic performance video of the song was availed on 28 January 2022, through YouTube.

Track listing

Personnel
Adapted from AllMusic.

 Jonathan Baines — vocals
 Lorenzo Baylor — vocals
 Natalie Brown — vocals
 Jonathan Buffum — engineer
 Cassie Campbell — bass
 Angelique Carter — vocals
 Tamar Chipp — vocals
 David Dennis — vocals
 Emily Douglas — vocals
 Jackson Dreyer — vocals
 Katelyn Drye — vocals
 E. Edwards — guitar
 Enaka Enyong — vocals
 David Funk — keyboards, programmer
 Sarah Gerald — vocals
 Sam Gibson — mixing
 Olivia Grasso — vocals
 Cecily Hennigan — vocals
 Jason Ingram — engineer, producer, programmer
 Nicole Johnson — vocals
 Benji Kurokose — vocals
 Shantrice Laura — vocals
 Drew Lavyne — mastering engineer
 Jenna Lee — vocals
 Jonathan Lee — guitar
 Brooke Ligertwood — guitar, keyboards, primary artist, producer, vocals
 Allison Marin — strings
 Antonio Marin — strings
 Daniella Mason — choir arrangement
 Daniel McMurray — drums
 Jonathan Mix — engineer
 Noah Moreno — vocals
 Brecken Myers — vocals
 Angela Nasby — vocals
 Jordyn Pierce — vocals
 Marci Pruzina — vocals
 Christine Rhee — vocals
 Emily Ruff — vocals
 Rylee Scott — vocals
 Zack Smith — vocals
 Cheryl Stark — vocals
 Keithon Stribling — vocals
 Dylan Thomas — guitar
 Bobby Valderrama — vocals
 Bria Valderrama — vocals
 Robby Valderrama — vocals
 John Wilds — vocals
 Mitch Wong — vocals
 Steph Wong — vocals

Charts

Release history

Other versions
 Passion released a version of the song featuring Brooke Ligertwood on their live album, Burn Bright (2022).

References

External links
 

2022 singles
2022 songs
Brooke Fraser songs
Songs written by Phil Wickham
Sparrow Records singles
Songs written by Brooke Fraser